Khalil Amir Sharieff (born November 22, 1994), is an American R&B singer, songwriter, and rapper from Sacramento, California.

Music career
In 2008, He worked under the auspices of L.A. Reid to record some material in Florida  after being discovered on YouTube. He was signed the same year to Def Jam Recordings, on the Teen Island label that was part of the music industry's response to "seize on the opportunities created by a phenomenon" of Justin Bieber; rather than focus on making a hit single, his manager was working to "developing him into a long-term artist." While signed with Def Jam, he recorded a few singles, but did not release an album.

The 2010 track "Girlfriend Ringtone" spent 13 weeks on Billboard's "Bubbling Under" chart but did not break onto the main Hot R&B/Hip-Hop Songs chart.

Khalil is featured on all of his songs on Lil Twist's mixtape The Golden Child hosted by DJ Ill Will. These are "Wait On Me", "If You Only Knew" and "#1812" the latter a co-featured artist with Lil Za.

On February 15, 2012, he released a collaborative mixtape with Lil Twist called 3 Weeks in Miami. On June 20, 2013, Khalil premiered his video for "Stars" on his VEVO account. The video "Hey Lil Mama" was released in early 2011.

On January 18, 2016, he released a single called 'Simple' off his upcoming EP 'A Long Way From 916' later renamed as 'Misunderstood'.

Controversies
Justin Bieber and Khalil Amir Sharieff were arrested, when the police saw them racing two luxury vehicles down the street at 4:09 a.m., in a residential area of Miami Beach, Florida; Bieber in a yellow Lamborghini and Khalil in a Ferrari, both under the heavy influence of drugs. Both were sentenced and fined in court, as on January 24, 2014.

Discography

Albums
 Hot Like Summer (Shelved)
 Prove It All (2017)

Extended plays

Mixtapes

Singles

As lead artist

Guest appearances

Music videos

As lead artist

References

External links
 Official website

1994 births
Musicians from Sacramento, California
Living people
American people of Moroccan descent
Singers from California
21st-century American singers
21st-century American male singers